"Nazad u veliki prljavi grad" (trans. "Back to the Big Dirty City") is a single from influential Serbian and former Yugoslav rock band Riblja Čorba.

B-side features an uncensored version of song "Mirno spavaj" (trans. "Sleep Peacefully").

Track listing
"Nazad u veliki prljavi grad" - 3:00
"Mirno spavaj" - 3:02

Personnel
Bora Đorđević - vocals
Miša Aleksić - bass guitar
Rajko Kojić - guitar
Momčilo Bajagić - guitar, bass guitar
Vicko Milatović - drums

1979 singles
Riblja Čorba songs
Songs written by Bora Đorđević